Graffiti is the fifth studio album by Japanese band Tokio. It was released on April 1, 1998. The album reached ninth place on the Oricon weekly chart and charted for three weeks.

Track listing

References 

1998 albums
Tokio (band) albums